Siratus consuela is a species of sea snail, a marine gastropod mollusk in the family Muricidae, the murex snails or rock snails.

Description
An uncommon species, trapped alive along with other species of Siratus at depths around 100 metres offshore West coast of Barbados

Distribution
This marine species occurs off Barbados, Domenica and Guadeloupe.

References

 Jensen, R. H. (1997). A Checklist and Bibliography of the Marine Molluscs of Bermuda. Unp. , 547 pp
 Merle D., Garrigues B. & Pointier J.-P. (2011) Fossil and Recent Muricidae of the world. Part Muricinae. Hackenheim: Conchbooks. 648 pp
 Houart, R. (2014). Living Muricidae of the world. Muricinae. Murex, Promurex, Haustellum, Bolinus, Vokesimurex and Siratus. Harxheim: ConchBooks. 197 pp
  Garrigues B . & Lamy D. 2018, 218. Muricidae récoltés au cours de la campagne KARUBENTHOS 2 du MNHN dans les eaux profondes de Guadeloupe (Antilles Françaises) et description de trois nouvelles espèces des genres Pagodula et Pygmaepterys (Mollusca, Gastropoda). Xenophora Taxonomy 20: 34-52
 arrigues B. & Lamy D. (2019). Inventaire des Muricidae récoltés au cours de la campagne MADIBENTHOS du MNHN en Martinique (Antilles Françaises) et description de 12 nouvelles espèces des genres Dermomurex, Attilosa, Acanthotrophon, Favartia, Muricopsis et Pygmaepterys (Mollusca, Gastropoda). Xenophora Taxonomy. 23: 22-59.

External links
 Verrill, A.H. (1950). New subspecies from the West Indies. Conchological Club of Southern California, Minutes. 101: 6-7.

Muricidae
Gastropods described in 1950